Mamore may refer to:

 Mamore, settlement in the Rosneath peninsula near Rahane, Scotland
John Campbell of Mamore (c. 1660–1729), Scottish Member of Parliament
John Campbell, 4th Duke of Argyll (c. 1693–1770), his son, known as Campbell of Mamore before his succession to the dukedom

The Mamores, group of mountains in Lochaber, Scotland

Mamoré River, in Bolivia and Brazil
Mamoré Province, in Bolivia
Mamore arboreal rice rat, native to Bolivia 

Mamore!, 2012 single from Japanese group Idoling!!!